Kerrier District 2 is an album by Kerrier District, an alias of Luke Vibert.

Track listing

CD version CAT 183 CD
"Ce Porte" - 5:12
"Disco Nasty" - 6:02
"Robotuss" - 5:34
"Sho U Rite" - 4:55
"Realistique" - 5:23
"Sho U Rite (Ceephax Remix)" - 7:34

12" version CAT 183 T
Side "A"
"Sho U Rite" (122 Bpm)
"Disco Nasty" (115 Bpm)
Side "AA"
"Ce Porte" (110 Bpm)

12" version CAT 183 R
Side "A"
"Robotuss" (116 Bpm)
"Realistique" (127 Bpm)
Side "AA"
"Sho U Rite (Ceephax Remix)"

References 

2006 EPs
Luke Vibert EPs
Rephlex Records EPs